Rajbala is an Indian politician and a member of 17th Legislative Assembly of Milak, Uttar Pradesh of India. She represents the Milak constituency of Uttar Pradesh. She is a member of the Bharatiya Janata Party.

Political career
Rajbala is a member of the 17th Legislative Assembly of Uttar Pradesh. She is a member of the Bharatiya Janata Party and since 2017, has represented the Milak constituency. Raj Bala Malik is Chandigarh mayor from 10 January 2020.

Posts held

See also
Uttar Pradesh Legislative Assembly

References

Uttar Pradesh MLAs 2017–2022
Bharatiya Janata Party politicians from Uttar Pradesh
Living people
People from Rampur district
Year of birth missing (living people)
Uttar Pradesh MLAs 2022–2027